Nikolai Sidorovich Vlasik (May 22, 1896 – June 18, 1967) was a ranking Soviet state security (NKVD-NKGB-MGB) officer, Lieutenant-General, best known as head of Joseph Stalin's personal security from 1931 to 1952.

Early life 
Nikolai Vlasik was born to a poor peasant family in the village of Bobynichi in the Slonimsky Uyezd of the Grodno Governorate (the present-day Hrodna Voblast in Belarus) of the Russian Empire on 22 May 1896. 

Drafted into the  Russian Army in March 1915, he earned the Cross of St. George during World War I, and by the time of the October Revolution in November 1917 had the rank of corporal. 

In November 1917 he began serving in the Moscow militia. In September 1919 he transferred to the Cheka. By January 1926 he had become the senior representative of the Operative branch of OGPU. Furthermore, Vlasik held supervising posts in the operations section, which included the protection of the heads of the party and government.

For many years, Vlasik served as chief of Stalin's personal protective service in the  Kremlin, beginning in 1931 (this service was subordinated directly to Stalin and independent of the secret police, the NKVD). He also became, in essence, a member of Stalin's family. After the death of Stalin’s wife, Nadezhda Alliluyeva in 1932, he also functioned as the tutor of Stalin's children and practically carried out the functions of a major-domo.

Stalin's daughter, Svetlana Allilueva, characterizes Vlasik in her memoirs as an "illiterate, silly, rough and extremely impudent despot". She said he was so corrupted by power that "he began to dictate to art workers and arts, tastes of comrade Stalin", and "...figures listened and followed his counsels. Any celebratory concert at the Bolshoi Theatre or George Hall did not take place without the sanction of Vlasik."

Arrest

On 15 December 1952, Vlasik was removed from his position and soon arrested on charges related to the Doctors' plot. Immediately after Stalin's death, all of the accused doctors were released and charges against them dropped. However, Vlasik was not released and the charges against him were changed to abuse of power and embezzlement. In 1955, he was stripped of his General rank and all decorations and exiled for ten years to Krasnoyarsk. In accordance with an earlier amnesty of 1953, his sentence was reduced to five years. In 1956, Vlasik was pardoned but his rank was not restored. In 2000, 33 years after his death, his sentence was annulled and he was completely exonerated.

In his memoirs Vlasik wrote, "I was severely hurt by Stalin. For 25 years of doing an irreproachable job, receiving nothing but encouragement and awards, I was excluded from the Party and flung into prison. For my boundless fidelity he gave me into the charge of my enemies. But never, for any minute of the condition I was in, to whatever mockeries I was exposed while in prison, had I in my soul any malice against Stalin".

Awards
 Cross of St. George, 4th class
 Three Orders of Lenin (26 April 1940, 21 February 1945, 16 September 1945)
 Order of the Red Banner, four times (28 August 1937, 20 September 1943, 3 November 1944)
 Order of the Red Star (14 May 1936)
 Order of Kutuzov, 1st class (24 February 1945)
 Jubilee Medal "XX Years of the Workers' and Peasants' Red Army" (22 February 1938)
 Honoured Worker of the Cheka-GPU, twice (20/12/1932, 16/12/1935)

Sources

References 
 Л.Колесник. Главный телохранитель Сталина (Судебное дело Н.С.Власика)

1896 births
1967 deaths
People from Slonim District
Bolsheviks
Cheka
Commissars 3rd Class of State Security
Communist Party of the Soviet Union members
Expelled members of the Communist Party of the Soviet Union
Russian military personnel of World War I
Soviet lieutenant generals
Soviet people of World War II
Soviet rehabilitations
Recipients of the Order of Lenin
Recipients of the Order of the Red Star
Recipients of the Order of the Red Banner
Recipients of the Order of Kutuzov, 1st class
Recipients of the Cross of St. George